Northern Vietnam is one of three geographical regions within Vietnam. It consists of three administrative regions: the Northwest (Vùng Tây Bắc), the Northeast (Vùng Đông Bắc), and the Red River Delta (Đồng Bằng Sông Hồng). It has a total area of about 109,942.9 km2. Tonkin is a historical exonym for this region plus the Thanh-Nghệ region.

Of the three geographical regions, the oldest is Northern Vietnam, where the Vietnamese culture originated over 2,000 years ago in the Red River Delta, though Vietnamese people eventually spread south into the Mekong Delta.

Administration
Northern Vietnam includes three administrative regions, which in turn comprises 25 First Tier units.

 Municipality (thành phố trực thuộc trung ương)

Of all 25 First Tier units, two are municipalities and 23 are provinces.

See also
 Northern, Central and Southern Vietnam
 Tonkin

References

Regions of Vietnam